Santo Niño, which means "holy child", is a Spanish title for the Christ Child (Jesus Christ as a child) and may also refer to:

Representations of Jesus
 Santo Niño de Cebú, a Filipino representation of the Child Jesus
 Santo Niño de Atocha, a Hispanic representation of the Child Jesus
 Santissimo Gesu de Malines (Infant Jesus of Mechelen), a Dutch representation of the Child Jesus that greatly resembles the image from Cebú
 Niño Dios of Mexico, Mexican representations of the Infant Jesus
 Niñopa, a depiction of the Baby Jesus that is considered to be the most popular of all the Niño Dios icons in Mexico.
 Divino Niño, a Colombian representation of the Infant Jesus
 Santo Bambino of Aracoeli, an Italian representation of the Infant Jesus
 Santo Niño de la Salud (Holy Infant of Good Health), a Child Jesus depiction from Morelia (Michoacán State), Mexico
 Santo Niño Jesus de la Praga (Infant Jesus of Prague), a representation of the Child Jesus in the Czech Republic
 Bambino Gesu of Arenzano, a Child Jesus depiction from Genoa, Italy

People other than Jesus
 Santo Niño de La Guardia, a Christian child allegedly murdered by Jews; cult suppressed as veneration was part of blood libel
 Saint Nino, a Christian Saint from Georgia

Places

Mexico
 El Santo Niño, Baja California Sur

Philippines
 Santo Niño de Arevalo, Arevalo, Iloilo City
 Santo Niño, Cagayan
 Santo Niño, Samar
 Santo Niño, South Cotabato
 Santo Niño, Parañaque in Metro Manila
 Santo Niño de Tondo Parish in Metro Manila
 Basilica Minore del Santo Niño in Cebu City
 Santo Niño de Paombong in Paombong Bulacan

See also
 Nino (disambiguation)